There are at least 11 named mountains in Daniels County, Montana.
 Dighans Hill, el. 
 Four Buttes, el. 
 Gregerson Hill, el. 
 Haugens Hill, el. 
 Jones Hill, el. 
 Long Butte, el. 
 Richland Hill, el. 
 Slaughter Hill, el. 
 Square Butte, el. 
 Sundby Hill, el. 
 Wild Horse Butte, el.

See also
 List of mountains in Montana
 List of mountain ranges in Montana

Notes

Landforms of Daniels County, Montana
Daniels